The Udarser Wiek is a bay on Germany's Baltic Sea coast, about 8 km² in area, between the islands of Rügen in the north and Ummanz in the south. In the west, the bodden transitions into the Schaproder Bodden and in the southeast to the Gahlitz in the lake of Koselower See. At the northeast end of the bay lies the island of Öhe.

The Udarser Wiek is very shallow (generally below 1.5 metres deep).

The bay was named after the village of Udars in the municipality of Schaprode on Rügen. The bodden is part of the Western Pomerania Lagoon Area National Park and it belongs to the West Rügen Bodden.

Geography of Rügen
West Rügen Bodden